Mikko Viitanen (born February 18, 1982) is a Finnish former professional ice hockey defenceman who most notably played in the Finnish Liiga. He was drafted 149th overall by the Colorado Avalanche in the 2001 NHL Entry Draft. Viitanen previously played seven seasons with JYP, joining from fellow Liiga club Lukko Rauma in 2009.

On April 23, 2015, Viitanen joined his fourth Finnish Liiga club, in agreeing to a two-year contract with Ässät Pori. Viitanen appeared in 32 games for 5 points in the 2015–16 season. With his campaign limited due to injury and with the toll of 15 professional seasons mounting, Viitanen opted to forgo the final year of his contract with Pori and end his professional hockey career on May 31, 2016.

Career statistics

Regular season and playoffs

International

References

External links

1982 births
Living people
Ässät players
Espoo Blues players
Colorado Avalanche draft picks
Finnish ice hockey defencemen
Hershey Bears players
JYP Jyväskylä players
Lowell Lock Monsters players
Lukko players
Reading Royals players